Montebello was a  74-gun ship of the line of the French Navy. She belonged to the Pluton subclass, or petit modèle.

Career 
Montebello, was one of the ships built in the various shipyards captured by the First French Empire in Holland and Italy in a crash programme to replenish the ranks of the French Navy. Started as Duquesne and renamed soon afterwards, she was built in Venice under supervision of engineers Jean Tupinier and Jean Dumonteil following plans by Sané.

She might have been launched in November 1813 and used as a floating battery in the defence of Venice. 

Still under construction, 22/24 completed,  Montebello was surrendered to Austria at the fall of Venice. The Austrians completed the construction and commissioned her in the Austrian Navy as Cesare. 

In 1816, she was found to have rotten timber. A commission examined her in 1820. She still existed in 1824.

Fate 
Cesare was eventually broken up between 1824  and before 1835.

Legacy 
A detailed 1/20th model of Montebello is on display at the Museo Storico Navale.

Sources and references 
 Notes

References

 Bibliography
 
  (1671-1870)
 

Ships of the line of the French Navy
Téméraire-class ships of the line
1815 ships